Dolby Laboratories (founded 1965) is an American company.

Dolby may also refer to:

People 
David C. Dolby (1946–2010), American soldier
Edwin Dolby (1838–1900), English architect
Hugh Dolby (1888–1964), English footballer
Peter Dolby (1940–2019), English footballer
Ray Dolby (1933–2013), American engineer
Thomas Dolby (born 1958), English musician
Tom Dolby (born 1975), American novelist
Charlotte Sainton-Dolby (1821–1885), English contralto
Craig Dolby (born 1988), British racing driver
Dagmar Dolby (born 1940s), American billionaire
Richard Dolby (born 1938), metallurgist
Sandra Stahl Dolby (born 1946), professor of Folklore and Ethnomusicology

Technology 
Dolby Cinema, a premium cinema concept
Dolby noise-reduction system (Dolby NR, invented 1965), a series of noise reduction systems for analog magnetic tape audio produced by Dolby Laboratories

Places 
Dolby Theatre (founded 2001) in USA

See also